The 2014 Conference USA women's basketball tournament is the postseason women's basketball tournament for Conference USA to be held from March 11–15, 2014 in El Paso, Texas. The three rounds will take place the Memorial Gym while the semifinals and championship will take place at Don Haskins Center.

Schedule

Bracket

All times listed are Mountain

References

2013–14 in American women's college basketball
Conference USA women's basketball tournament
Conference USA women's basketball
Conference USA women's Basketball Tournament
Basketball competitions in El Paso, Texas
Women's sports in Texas
College basketball tournaments in Texas